

1930

References

External links
 Filipino film at the Internet Movie Database

1940s
Films
Philippines